Philip Bennet may refer to:

 Philip Bennet (Bath MP) (died 1761), Member of Parliament for Bath 1741–1747
 Philip Bennet (Suffolk MP) (1795–1866), British Conservative Party Member of Parliament for West Suffolk 1845–1859

See also 
Philip Bennett (disambiguation)